James Hunter Niswander (born November 26, 1994) is an American football punter who is currently a free agent. He played college football at Northwestern University.

Early years
Niswander attended Woodridge High School. As a freshman, he made a 35-yard field goal that sealed a state playoff appearance for the first time in school history.

As a senior, he set the state record for most consecutive extra points made (111) and the school longest field goal made (53 yards). He received All-PTC and All-Ohio Division III honors.

He also practiced soccer and basketball.

College career
Nisander accepted a football scholarship from the Northwestern University. As a redshirt freshman, he was a backup behind Chris Gradone and punted only five times during the season. As a sophomore, he was named the starter at punter. He averaged 42.8 yards per punt and appeared in every game.

As a junior, he ranked fourth in the Big Ten Conference with a 41.3 punt average. He had a 51-yard average in the season opener against Western Michigan University. He made a 62-yard punt against Illinois State University and Michigan State University.

As a senior, he averaged 43 yards per punt. He had a career-high 51.5-yard average against Bowling Green State University. He tied for the fourth longest punt (80 yards) in school history against the University of Iowa. He received All-Academic Big Ten honors.

Professional career

DC Defenders (XFL)
Niswander was out of football after being invited for a tryout at the Pittsburgh Steelers rookie minicamp in 2018. He was selected in the fifth phase of the 2020 XFL Draft by the DC Defenders. He appeared in all 5 games, while punting 21 times for an average of 44.6 yards.

In March, amid the COVID-19 pandemic, the league announced that it would be cancelling the rest of the season. On April 10, he had his contract terminated when the league suspended operations.

Dallas Cowboys
On October 26, 2020, Niswander was signed to the Dallas Cowboys' practice squad. He was promoted to the active roster on November 7, 2020, after punter Chris Jones was placed on injured reserve with a core muscle injury. He averaged 47.2 yards on 26 punts in the final eight games, tying for ninth-best in the NFL. He landed 10 of his punts inside the 20-yard-line. He kicked a 56 yard punt in Week 16 against the Philadelphia Eagles. His production convinced the Cowboys to release Jones on March 17, 2021.

On April 7, 2021, punter Bryan Anger was signed to compete with Niswander for the starting position. Anger pulled ahead of him during training camp, so Niswander also focused on placekicking duties, to provide depth while Greg Zuerlein recovered from offseason back surgery. In two preseason games, he was 4 out of 6 attempts, including making all 3 field goal attempts against the Arizona Cardinals. On August 16, Niswander suffered a back injury of his own during a training camp practice. On August 19, he was waived/injured and placed on injured reserve the next day. On December 28, 2021, he was placed on the reserve/COVID-19 list. On January 10, 2022, he was activated from the reserve/COVID-19 list. On April 14, 2022, the Cowboys waived Niswander.

References

External links
Northwestern Wildcats bio

1994 births
Living people
American football punters
Northwestern Wildcats football players
Players of American football from Ohio
DC Defenders players
Dallas Cowboys players